Enigmaticolus desbruyeresi is a species of sea snail, a marine gastropod mollusk in the family Eosiphonidae, the true whelks and their allies.

Description
Easily distinguishable from all other Enigmaticolus species by the complete lack of a subsutural ramp. Also exhibits weak spiral cords on the base.

Distribution
Found in hydrothermal vents in Manus, North Fiji, and Lau basins in the southwestern Pacific and off Luzon, Philippines. Individuals have been known to live 1456–2750 m deep.

References

Eosiphonidae
Gastropods described in 1993